Coleophora telonica is a moth of the family Coleophoridae. It is found in southern France.

The larvae feed on Alyssum spinosum. They create a greyish composite leaf case of about 9 mm built from three to five mined leaf fragments. The mouth angle is 50-60°. Hibernation takes place when the cases are still small. Full-grown larvae can be found in spring when the host plant is developing new foliage.

References

telonica
Moths of Europe
Moths described in 1991